Miesbach is a Landkreis (district) in Bavaria, Germany. It is bounded by (from the west and clockwise) the districts of Bad Tölz-Wolfratshausen, Munich and Rosenheim, and by the Austrian state of Tyrol.

History
In medieval times most of the district was occupied by clerical states. The Miesbach district is the union of the areas that were formerly occupied by the Hohenwaldeck county, the territories owned by the powerful Tegernsee Abbey, the territories owned by the Weyarn Abbey and Valley County.
Hohenwaldeck was annexed by Bavaria in 1734, Valley in 1777. The clerical states were dissolved in 1803 and fell to Bavaria as well.

Miesbach was established in 1803 the foundation ceremony took place in the court district of Hohenwaldeck.
In 1818 Tegernsee was established. The same year the Bad Aibling district was established too and Miesbach had to deliver 12 municipalities.
In 1939 Tegernsee was merged into Miesbach. During the territorial reform in Bavaria in 1972 Otterfing was merged into Miesbach too and the district Wolfratshausen as well.

Geography

The southern half of the district is located in the Bavarian Alps. This section of the Alps is called Mangfall Mountains (Mangfallgebirge) as the River Mangfall has its source here. The most important peaks are Rotwand ("Red Wall", 1884 m), the highest mountain in the area and Wendelstein (1838 m) .

The river Mangfall, a short but broad affluent of the river Inn, flows northward with the district's municipalities on either bank. In the initial part of its course it runs through Tegernsee Lake (9 km²).

Coat of arms
The coat of arms displays:
 a red eagle and two crossed staves, symbolising the county of Hohenwaldeck
 two water lily leaves above a wavy line, the ancient arms of the monastery of Tegernsee

Government

Towns and municipalities

References

External links

Official website (German)

 
Districts of Bavaria